Marguerite Pierry (26 December 1887, Paris – 20 January 1963, Paris) was a French actress.

Selected filmography 
 On purge bébé (1931)
 The Two Boys (1936)
 The Citadel of Silence (1937)
 Southern Mail (1937)
 Conflict (1938)
 Monsieur Brotonneau (1939)
 Whirlwind of Paris (1939)
 Miquette (1940)
 Paris-New York (1940)
 Miss Bonaparte (1942)
 The Lost Woman (1942)
 The Phantom Baron (1943)
 Box of Dreams (1945)
 The Husbands of Leontine (1947)
 Counter Investigation (1947)
 The Ladies in the Green Hats (1949)
 Dr. Knock (1951)
 Monsieur Octave (1951)
 Madame du Barry (1954)
 Napoleon (1955)
 Nana (1955)
 The Ostrich Has Two Eggs (1957)
 Les frangines (1960)

References

Bibliography 
 Hayward, Susan. Simone Signoret: The Star as Cultural Sign. Continuum, 2004.

External links 

1887 births
1963 deaths
French film actresses
Actresses from Paris
20th-century French actresses